A list of notable books written by CEOs, about CEOs and business.

Books

References

CEO